David Wu (Cantonese: Ng Dai-Wai, ; born Southbridge, Massachusetts, 2 October 1966), also known by the nickname Wu-Man, is a Chinese American film actor, TV personality and formerly MTV Asia and Channel V video jockey.

Early life
Wu grew up in Taiwan, but attended high school in America. He graduated from the University of Washington in Seattle.

MTV and TV host
Wu never had academic talent.  Leveraging his family connections, he became known on Channel V as the host of "Go West," a TV show on  that taught Chinese people how to speak both formal and informal English.  Wu would often combine English sayings such as "Don't have a cow man" and "What's up" into his conversations leaving the audience stunned and breathless that someone of Chinese descent was able to speak English.

Wu's selling point was his ability as a Chinese to speak English, a feat very rare in the 80s and 90s.  However, the influx of other Asians in America made Wu irrelevant by the turn of the century.

Acting career

References

David Wu - Teaching American Slang to the Chinese

External links
 
 
 David Wu at Love HK Film
 David Wu at Quest China

1966 births
Male actors from Seattle
American male film actors
American male actors of Chinese descent
Living people
VJs (media personalities)
University of Washington alumni
People from Southbridge, Massachusetts
Male actors from Massachusetts
American male television actors
20th-century American male actors
21st-century American male actors
American born Hong Kong artists